Kyah Pam Simon (born 25 June 1991) is an Australian professional soccer player who plays as a striker for Tottenham Hotspur of the FA Women's Super League. In 2011, Simon became the first Indigenous Australian player to score a goal in a FIFA Women's World Cup.

Simon has played for Sydney FC, Central Coast Mariners, Western Sydney Wanderers, and Melbourne City in the Australian W-League, as well as Boston Breakers and Houston Dash in the American National Women's Soccer League (NWSL).

Early life and education
Kyah Pam Simon, who is of Aboriginal Australian descent, was born on 25 June 1991 in the western suburbs of Sydney in New South Wales, one of four children. Her mother, Pam, is of the Anaiwan people, while her father, Gordon, is of the Biripi and Kamilaroi peoples. The family moved to Quakers Hill when she was a year old and she attended school at Pacific Hills Christian School, with her siblings. She only later realised what enormous sacrifices her parents had made for their children to attend private school, and to support her career. She later attended Hills Sports High School, where Alen Stajcic (later coach of the Matildas) was head coach.

Growing up amongst a family of rugby league players, Simon was introduced to soccer by her neighbors, and began playing for the Quakers Hill under-8s and fell in love with the game. As a youth, she played for the Hills Brumbies before moving across to Penrith Nepean United. At age 15, she broke her leg just on the verge of earning a scholarship with the NSW Institute of Sport, but that did not deter her from pursuing her dream. She made her national debut for the Australia women's national soccer team the following year at age 16.

Club career

Central Coast Mariners
Simon made her debut for the Central Coast Mariners against Melbourne Victory on Saturday, 25 October 2008. Simon then made her scoring debut during Round 3 against Canberra United, scoring a double to assist the Mariners to a 2–1 win away from home.

Sydney FC
Simon joined Sydney FC for the 2009 W-League Season, playing in the first round against former club the Central Coast Mariners.

She was the top scorer in the 2010–11 W-League with 11 goals in 12 games. She also earned Player of the Year, Young Player of the Year and Players Player of the Year honours.

Boston Breakers
In April 2012, Simon signed with the Boston Breakers for the first and only season of the Women's Premier Soccer League Elite (WPSL Elite). She finished the season as the team's leading scorer with 12 goals and 26 points. She also ranked second in the league in the same categories. Simon logged 1,052 minutes with the Breakers and finished with two assists.

In 2013, Simon signed as a free agent with the Breakers for the inaugural season of the National Women's Soccer League.

Western Sydney Wanderers
In September 2013, Simon signed with Western Sydney Wanderers.

Return to Sydney FC
After being injured for most of the 2013–14 season and hardly playing, Simon returned to Sydney FC for the 2014 season.

Return to Boston Breakers
On 30 June 2015, after leading the Australia women's national soccer team to a quarter-final of the 2015 FIFA Women's World Cup, the Boston Breakers announced the signing of Simon, returning her to the National Women's Soccer League.

In January 2017, citing a need to "get my mind and body back to 100 percent health and fitness, and be ready for the next season", it was announced that Simon would not return to the Boston Breakers for the 2017 season.  The Breakers retain the rights to her contract for the 2017 season.

Melbourne City
On 6 October 2017, Simon returned to Australia, joining Melbourne City.

Houston Dash
After the Breakers folded ahead of the 2018 NWSL season, the NWSL held a dispersal draft to distribute Breakers players across the league. Her rights were selected 6th overall by Houston. On 28 February, the Dash announced they signed Simon to a contract. She made her debut for the Dash on 28 April against the North Carolina Courage in a 2–0 loss. Simon scored her first goal of the season in a 1–1 draw against the Portland Thorns FC on 9 May. Following the 2019 NWSL season, the Dash and Kyah came to a mutual agreement to depart the club, placing her on the re-entry wire.

International career

Simon made her debut for the Australia women's national soccer team in August 2007, at the age of 16, in a match against Hong Kong. She scored her first goal in a win over Brazil in the 2008 Peace Cup. In 2010, she scored the winning penalty for Australia to win the 2010 Asian Cup.

Simon appeared at the 2011 FIFA Women's World Cup, where she scored both of Australia's goals in a 2–1 win over Norway to ensure qualification for the quarter finals. She was the first male or female Indigenous Australian player to score a goal in a World Cup tournament.

During the 2015 FIFA Women's World Cup round of 16 match against higher ranked Brazil, Simon slotted in the winning goal on a rebound after an initial attempt by Lisa De Vanna bounced off the Brazilian goalkeeper Luciana. The Matildas qualified for a historic quarter-final match after the 1–0 win against Brazil, however were knocked out by Japan in the quarterfinal. Simon played each of Australia's 5 matches and scored 3 goals, including both goals in a 2–0 win against Nigeria in group stage.

During the 2020 Tokyo Olympics, Simon became the ninth Matilda and first Indigenous Australian player to reach 100 caps. The Matildas qualified for the quarter-finals and beat Great Britain before being eliminated in the semi-final with Sweden. In the playoff for the Bronze medal they were beaten by the USA.

Other activities
Simon has learnt about the hardships and discrimination endured by her grandparents' families, which gave her new appreciation for what her family has given her. She has said "...every time I pull on the Matildas jersey, it's for my family. As I see it, the jersey is as much theirs as mine".

She is proud of her Aboriginal heritage, and appreciates social media for the role it plays in helping to "change that conversation [about what it means to be Aboriginal] and open people's eyes to get different perspectives". Simon was instrumental in the Matildas' decision to display the Aboriginal flag in the team photo for their first game of the Tokyo Olympics, as a uniquely Australian gesture, rather than taking the knee in solidarity with the Black Lives Matter movement. She has joined Football Australia's inaugural National Indigenous Advisory Group to help foster engagement between the game and Aboriginal and Torres Strait Islander people.

In popular culture

Television and film
In 2013, Simon was featured in an hour-long episode of ESPN's Aussies Abroad entitled, The Matildas, which profiled four Australian national team players (Simon, Lisa De Vanna, Samantha Kerr, and Caitlin Foord) and their experience playing internationally.

Simon was also one of the subjects, the other being Lydia Williams, of a football documentary titled No Apologies by filmmaker Ashley Morrison. This documentary tells the story of the two Aboriginal female footballers and their journey to the Women's World Cup in Germany in 2011.

Magazines
In June 2011, Simon was on the cover of the Australian FourFourTwo Magazine along with fellow Matilda's Melissa Barbieri, Sam Kerr, Thea Slatyer and Sarah Walsh.

Career statistics

International appearances

International goals
Scores and results list Australia's goal tally first.

Honours

Club
Sydney FC
 W-League Championship: 2009, 2012–13
 W-League Premiership: 2009, 2010–11

Melbourne City
 W-League Championship: 2017–2018

Country
Australia
 AFC Women's Asian Cup: 2010
 AFC Olympic Qualifying Tournament: 2016

Individual
 Julie Dolan Medal: 2010–11
 W-League Golden Boot: 2010–11
 W-League Young Player of the Year: 2010–11

See also
 List of players who have appeared in multiple FIFA Women's World Cups
 List of W-League (Australia) hat-tricks
 List of Indigenous Australian sportspeople
 List of Australian sportswomen
 List of Australia women's international soccer players
 List of association football families

References

Further reading
 Grainey, Timothy (2012), Beyond Bend It Like Beckham: The Global Phenomenon of Women's Soccer, University of Nebraska Press, 
 Stay, Shane (2019), The Women's World Cup 2019 Book: Everything You Need to Know About the Soccer World Cup, Books on Demand, 
 Theivam, Keiran and Jeff Kassouf (2019), The Making of the Women's World Cup: Defining stories from a sport's coming of age, Little, 
 Various (2019), Stand Up for the Future, Penguin Random House, 
 Williams, Jean (2007), A Beautiful Game: International Perspectives on Women's Football , A&C Black, 
 Williams, Lydia (2019), Saved!, Allen & Unwin,

External links

 
 Football Federation Australia player profile
 Boston Breakers player profile
 Kyah Simon's first-person articles

1991 births
Living people
Australian women's soccer players
Indigenous Australian soccer players
Central Coast Mariners FC (A-League Women) players
2011 FIFA Women's World Cup players
2015 FIFA Women's World Cup players
Footballers at the 2016 Summer Olympics
People from Blacktown, New South Wales
Boston Breakers players
National Women's Soccer League players
Expatriate women's soccer players in the United States
Sydney FC (A-League Women) players
Melbourne City FC (A-League Women) players
A-League Women players
Western Sydney Wanderers FC (A-League Women) players
Women's Premier Soccer League Elite players
Australia women's international soccer players
Women's association football forwards
Australian expatriate sportspeople in the United States
Indigenous Australian Olympians
Olympic soccer players of Australia
Houston Dash players
Footballers at the 2020 Summer Olympics
FIFA Century Club
Soccer players from Sydney
Sportswomen from New South Wales
Australian expatriate sportspeople in England
Australian expatriate sportspeople in the Netherlands
Expatriate women's footballers in England
Expatriate women's footballers in the Netherlands
Women's Super League players
Tottenham Hotspur F.C. Women players
PSV (women) players
Australian expatriate women's soccer players